Ability Plus Software is a software development company founded in 1991 for the purposes of developing and marketing Ability-branded products: Ability Office, an office suite for Microsoft Windows and earlier, Ability Plus — an integrated package running under DOS.

Beginnings
Ability Plus Software was formed in London, United Kingdom, shortly after Migent (UK) ceased to trade in 1991. It acquired the source code for the Ability Plus package, and with some of the ex-Migent staff and the help of LANware Inc, which had acquired sales and marketing rights in the US from Migent Inc, began a program of product development which has continued to the present day.

Strategic Partners
Starting in 1993, Ability Plus Software teamed-up with Great Bear, a U.S. company with an office in Sofia, Bulgaria to develop a new Windows product — Ability Office — as a successor to Ability Plus. Great Bear are now based wholly in Sofia, and the partnership remains intact.

In 2004, Ability Plus Software entered into a long-term marketing and sales agreement with Ability Software International, part of the Formjet PLC Group. FormJet is also an exclusive distributor of Panda Security. Ability Plus Software now manages software development, and Ability Software International handles all sales and marketing worldwide.

References and footnotes

External links
 Company website
 ASI
 Technologies

Software companies established in 1991
Software companies based in London
1991 establishments in England
British companies established in 1991